Hicken is a surname. Notable people with the surname include:

Blair Hicken (born 1965), Canadian swimmer
Barry Hicken (born 1946), Canadian politician and farmer
Dan Hicken (born 1963), American television journalist
Harry Hicken (1882–1964), English trade unionist